We in the Zone (Hangul: 위인더존) was a South Korean boy band formed in Seoul in 2019 under Choon Entertainment. The group was composed of five members: Min, Kyeongheon, Eson, Jooan, and Shihyun. They debuted on May 27, 2019 with their self-titled album "We in the Zone".

History

Pre-debut 
Shihyun participated in the Mnet survival series Produce 101 Season 2 in 2017. He left the show before its official airing due to medical reasons. He later debuted in the duo group Longguo & Shihyun with the album the.the.the. The duo has quietly disbanded. Shihyun released "Sweet Potato X 100" with Kim So-hee. He later participated in MBC survival show Under Nineteen in 2018, placing tenth in the final episode.

During late 2018, Choon Entertainment announced a new boy group by the name of WITZ. The group consisted of Eson, Jooan, and Kyeongheon. Eson and Jooan both released mixtapes. WITZ released dance covers on their YouTube channel.

In April, it was announced that WITZ would be debuting with the additional members Shihyun and Min.

2019–2021: Debut, We in the Zone, Min's and Kyungheon's departure, and disbandment 
The group originally announced the debut date to be May 29, but was later changed to the 27th of the month. Leading up to the release of the album, the group revealed album prologs for each member. On May 27, 2019, the group debuted with their self-titled album with a few self produced songs. They held their debut show case at Hongdae Hana Tour V Hall in Seoul, performing a number of songs off of the album including their title track.

On October 23, Min left the group and terminated his contract due to personal reasons. 

On January 15, 2021, Kyeongheon announced via Instagram he would be leaving the group.  Kyeongheon also revealed on Instagram that the members have terminated their contracts with Choon Entertainment.

Former members 
 Min (민)
 Kyeongheon (경헌)
 Eson (이슨)
 Jooan (주안)
 Shihyun (시현)

Timeline

Discography

Extended plays

Singles

References 

2019 establishments in South Korea
Musical groups from Seoul
K-pop music groups
Musical groups established in 2019
South Korean dance music groups
South Korean boy bands
Choon Entertainment artists
Under Nineteen contestants
2021 disestablishments in South Korea